The Capture of the corvette Pilcomayo was a battle of the Naval campaign of the War of the Pacific. In the battle, the Peruvian gunboat Pilcomayo was captured by the Chilean ironclad Blanco Encalada after a brief confrontation.

Background

With the capture of the Huáscar, Chile obtained a wide advantage in the sea, which would seek to prevent the allies from concentrating their armies in southern Peru. In this way, the political objective of the war was more ambitious for the Chileans, and it was not only sought to ensure Chilean sovereignty between parallels 23 and 25 South, but also to obtain favorable territorial compensation.

With this, the Chilean army imposed the need to seek the destruction of the Peruvian-Bolivian forces present in Tarapacá, starting the Tarapacá campaign. Within this, the assault and Battle of Pisagua occurred on November 2, 1879, an operation that culminated in the Chilean occupation of the place.

In this context, the Chilean Navy was careful to maintain free control of the sea to facilitate its own maritime transport and prevent that of the allies, in such a way as to isolate the adversary forces in the region.

Order of Battle

Peru

The Unión was a corvette built in 1865 , with a wooden hull protected with iron and copper. She displaced 2016 t and had 12 muzzle-loading 70 lb Voruz rifled guns as main armament, in the battery and 6 per side. She also had two 70lb Armstrong guns in the bow and a 9lb Withworth muzzle-loading gun. Her propulsion system was also mixed with a propeller and being able to reach a maximum speed of 13 kn. She was commanded by Captain Nicolás Portal.

The Pilcomayo gunboat was a ship built in 1874 and was armed with two 70-pound Armstrong muzzle-loading guns, one on each side of the ship and four 40-pound muzzle-loading guns, two on each side, also rifled, and a Gatling gun. On the day of the fight, her speed was 11 kn. She was under the command of the ship's captain Carlos Ferreyros.

The Chalaco had an iron hull 90.4 m long that displaced 999 t . Her propulsion system was mixed, steam with double wheel and sail . Her machine allowed her to reach a walking speed of 12 kn . Her armament consisted of four 30- pound Parrott guns , two in the bow and two in the stern, and two 70-pound guns in the sundeck. She was under the command of frigate captain Manuel Villavicencio.

Chile

The Blanco Encalada was a 64 m long, 3,560 t armored frigate with a double steel hull. She had 9 -inch thick armor in the center and 4.5 in the bow and stern. Her armament consisted of 6 Armstrong muzzle -loading 250-lb. rifled guns in a central battery (3 per band), 2 20-lb. rifled guns and 2 7-lb. Her propulsion system was mixed, steam with double propeller and sail , being able to reach a maximum speed of 9 kn on the day of the combat, she was commanded by Admiral Galvarino Riveros.

The Capture
Knowing that the Blanco Encalada was superior to all three ships, they began to head south.

When the Commander of the Pilcomayo, Carlos Ferreyros realized that the distance was rapidly closing, he gathered his officers in council, agreeing to sink the ship before surrendering, beating a retreat in order to have enough time to execute the plan.

Being at 5,000 meters, the Pilcomayo opened fire in elevation without damaging the Blanco Encalada. The Chilean ironclad did not open fire until 4,200 m, reaching the peak of the Peruvian corvette's foremast. At the same time, Commander Ferreyros had the bottom valves opened to flood the engine and magazine and ordered all kinds of flammable material to be spilled to set the ship on fire. The aft guns were aimed over the wardroom hatch to pierce the hull below the waterline. He then arranged for the ship's codes, correspondence and documents to be destroyed.

Soon enough, the fire started and the ship was stopped and the crew lowered the boats to disembark the ship. When Chilean Admiral Riveros saw signals with white flags being made from the boats, he ordered a ceasefire and the machine to stop so that Lieutenant Roberto Goñi could board the Peruvian ship.

Boarding the Pilcomayo, Goñi replaced the Peruvian emblem with the Chilean emblem and dedicated all his efforts to save the ship, mooring it to the Blanco Encalada so that with its bilge pumps it would prevent its sinking and simultaneously reinforce the personnel that put out the fires. In two hours they managed to cover the waterways with divers and put out the fires.

Subsequently, the Chileans continued to take it in tow to the port of Pisagua, arriving on November 20, where the Peruvian prisoners were embarked on the Vapor Loa and then heading to the port of Valparaíso with the Pilcomayo'', landing on December 4, to the joy of the population that invaded the streets to pay homage to the victorious sailors. In the port, the already ex-Peruvian ship would receive many repairs.

References

Notes

Conflicts in 1879
Battles of the War of the Pacific
Battles involving Peru
Battles involving Chile
November 1879 events
Naval battles of the War of the Pacific
1870s in Peru
War of the Pacific orders of battle